Tim Furey was a Democratic member of the Montana House of Representatives, representing the 91st district from October 2007 to January 2013.

Montana House of Representatives
In 2004, Tim Furey's son Kevin was elected to the Montana House of Representatives. Kevin served for three years before being called to active duty as a First Lieutenant in the United States Army Reserves in Iraq. Kevin recommended his father be appointed to the seat after his resignation in 2007. Local Democrats agreed to the request and appointed Tim Furey to serve as State Representative for the 91st district.

While a member of the Montana House of Representatives, Furey serves on the following committees; Agriculture, Business & Labor and Human Services. In 2011, he voted against the bill that repealed Initiative 148. This reinstated criminal penalties for use of medical marijuana that Montana voters had repealed by a 62%-38% margin in 2004.

References

External links
Biography, bills and committees at the 62nd Montana General Assembly
Past sessions: 62nd, 61st, 60th
Timothy Furey's Legislative Profile at the Open States Project

1954 births
Living people
Democratic Party members of the Montana House of Representatives
Politicians from Missoula, Montana
University of Montana alumni
Northern Illinois University alumni